Sarantaporo.gr is a non-profit wireless network community founded in 2013 in Elassona Municipality in Greece. The network helps locals organize cooperative work to deploy and operate the wireless network infrastructure, organized as a commons.

The WCN participated in the CONFINE, the netCommons and the MAZI research projects. A documentary presents the networks in the Sarantaporo area.

References 

Community networks
Wireless community networks
Wireless network organizations